Salvador Rivera (born 1928) was a Peruvian boxer. He competed in the men's bantamweight event at the 1948 Summer Olympics.

References

External links
 

1928 births
Possibly living people
Peruvian male boxers
Olympic boxers of Peru
Boxers at the 1948 Summer Olympics
Place of birth missing
Bantamweight boxers
20th-century Peruvian people